Macrotrema caligans is a species of swamp eel native to Peninsular Malaysia and the Mae Nam Chao Praya basin in Thailand. The male guards a nest in a burrow. This species is the only known member of its genus.

References

Synbranchidae
Monotypic fish genera
Fish described in 1849